The Delicate Dependency: A Novel of the Vampire Life is a 1982 vampire novel by Michael Talbot.

Plot
In Victorian London, widowed Dr. John Gladstone runs over a beautiful young man named Niccolo Cavalanti with his carriage. When others at the hospital begin to notice the injured man's unnatural healing ability, Gladstone shelters a recovering Niccolo in his home, and soon learns that the kind man is a vampire. Niccolo befriends both of Gladstone's daughters, the coming of age Ursula and the blind toddler Camille, and then disappears with Camille. Accompanied by Lady Hespeth Dunaway, a woman whose son was also abducted by Niccolo, Gladstone sets off to find his daughter.

Publication
The Delicate Dependency was published by Avon Books on March 28, 1982, and eventually went out of print. It was republished by Valancourt Books in 2014.

Reception
In Encyclopedia of the Vampire, Darrell Schweitzer called the novel "one of the most impressive explorations of a vampire mind ever written".Publishers Weekly called The Delicate Dependency "ambitious, "impressive", and "unflaggingly interesting.” Whitley Strieber noted of the novel, "The tension builds page by page to a stunning climax ... I doubt that I will ever forget it.” Fangoria named The Delicate Dependency as one of its "Top 10 Vampire Novels" in 1992.

References

1982 American novels
American horror novels
American vampire novels
Avon (publisher) books